Camp Firefly is a week-long summer camp run by the non-profit Firefly Foundation in Atlanta, Georgia, which was founded by married-couple film actors Kirk Cameron and Chelsea Noble. It gives terminally ill children and their families a free week's vacation.

Inspired by Cameron's work with sick children when he was a television actor, Camp Firefly began around 1990 and focuses on also helping accompanying family members. Six or seven families attend each year's retreat, and as of 2012, over 100 families had attended, according to an interview with Cameron by Indiana Wesleyan University. Theme nights during the camp week have included activities such as luaus, barn dancing, and safaris.

The camp received a donation from Sherwood Baptist Church, in whose major 2008 film, Fireproof, Cameron had starred without payment.

References

External links 
 

Summer camps for children with special needs
Summer camps in Georgia (U.S. state)